Port-Gentil Football Club, also known as POG FC, is a Gabonese football club based in Port-Gentil, Gabon.

The club currently plays in Gabon Championnat National D1.

Stadium
Currently the team plays at the 7,000 capacity Stade Pierre Claver Divounguy.

League participations
Gabon Championnat National D1: 2013–14
Gabon Second Division: 2012–13

References

External links
Web site
Soccerway

Football clubs in Gabon